Elinor Zimmerman Taylor (April 18, 1921 – July 27, 2010) was a Republican member of the Pennsylvania House of Representatives, representing the 156th legislative district from 1977 through her retirement in 2006. Taylor served in the House Republican leadership as Majority Caucus Chair.

She attended West Chester High School, graduating in 1939. In 1943, she graduated from West Chester University, where she later received a Doctor of Public Service, honoris causa. In 1958 she earned a Master's in Education from Temple University. At various times, she attended classes at Columbia University and University of Delaware.

She was first elected to represent the 156th legislative district in the Pennsylvania House of Representatives in 1976. During her career, she focused on higher education and constituent service. In 1982, she famously engineered a deal that led to the downfall of a West Chester University President Charles G. Mayo. She was elected Republican (Majority) Caucus Secretary in 1995 and alter served in the mostly-ceremonial leadership position of caucus chairwoman.

She retired prior to the 2006 elections with her health deteriorating. She said, "My approach has always been the idea that I could make a difference. And as long as I have been able to do that, you end the day with great satisfaction. I'm very very pleased to look back on what I consider to be a very productive experience."

References

External links
 official PA House website (archived)
 official Party website (archived)

Republican Party members of the Pennsylvania House of Representatives
West Chester University alumni
Temple University alumni
University of Delaware alumni
Columbia University alumni
Women state legislators in Pennsylvania
1921 births
2010 deaths
21st-century American women